Killure is a townland and civil parish in County Waterford near Waterford Airport.

References

Townlands of County Waterford